Gascoigne Road is a main road in Kowloon, Hong Kong, going west-east from Nathan Road to Chatham Road South through the head of King's Park, leading vehicles from West Kowloon to the Cross-Harbour Tunnel.

Built in 1977, it is part of the West Kowloon Corridor.

History
The road was laid out after 1901 and named after William Julius Gascoigne, Commander British Troops in China and Hong Kong from 18981903. It was reported in 1908 that "All the roads on the [Kowloon] peninsula are wide and lined with trees, and two in particular—Robinson Road [today's Nathan Road] and Gascoigne Road—are noticeable by reason of their width" and "Gascoigne Road, which is 100 feet wide, runs right across the peninsula from Hunghom to Yaumati, and skirts the King's Park, a large enclosure reserved for recreation, and the United Services Recreation Ground."

The Fronde Memorial, a granite obelisk, was erected in May 1908 in memory of the five sailors of the French Arquebuse-class destroyer Fronde who disappeared in the sinking of their boat near the Torpedo Depot, Kowloon, during the 1906 Hong Kong typhoon. Initially erected at the corner of Gascoigne Road and Jordan Road, the monument was relocated to Hong Kong Cemetery in Happy Valley during the 1960s. The Fronde was later salvaged, repaired in the Hung Hom shipyard, and left Hong Kong in March 1907. It was active during World War I and was decommissioned in 1919.

Gascoigne Road was widened in 1988 and the adjacent slope near the Queen Elizabeth Hospital was cut back. A 12m high rock-socketed caisson retaining wall was constructed to support the cutting.

Features
Northern side of the road: (from east to west)
 Headquarters building of the Hong Kong Girl Guides Association (#8)
 Club de Recreio (西洋波會) (#20). The Club was founded in 1911 by prominent members of the Portuguese community in Hong Kong. The present clubhouse was built in 1928. Grade III historic building.
 YMCA King's Park Centenary Centre (#22)
 India Club (印度會) (#24). The present clubhouse building was built in 1956. Grade III historic building.
 Queen Elizabeth Hospital (#30)
 Hong Kong Labour Tribunal (#36)
 Old South Kowloon District Court (#38). Grade I historic building.
 Kowloon Methodist Church (循道衛理聯合教會九龍堂) (#40). Erected between 1950 and 1951, it is the largest church building of the Methodist Church in Hong Kong.
 Methodist College (Kowloon) (#50). The campus includes the buildings of the former Grantham College of Education, which was located at No. 42 Gascoigne Road.
 Former access to an air raid precaution (ARP) tunnel. Near the junction with Nathan Road.

Southern side of the road: (from east to west)
 Gun Club Hill Barracks
 United Services Recreation Club (USRC; 三軍會) (#1). Opened in 1911 as a British military club, it is now owned by the People's Liberation Army, but administered as a limited company with a wholly civilian membership.
 Diocesan Girls' School
 Eaton Hotel Hong Kong

See also
 List of streets and roads in Hong Kong

References

External links

Google Maps of Gascoigne Road
  More details about the Fronde incident: 
 Information and pictures of the Fronde monument: 

King's Park, Hong Kong
Yau Ma Tei
Roads in Kowloon
Route 5 (Hong Kong)